The 1990 Derby City Council election took place on 3 May 1990 to elect members of Derby City Council in England. Local elections were held in the United Kingdom in 1990. This was on the same day as other local elections. 16 of the council's 44 seats were up for election. The Conservative Party retained control of the council.

Overall results

|-
| colspan=2 style="text-align: right; margin-right: 1em" | Total
| style="text-align: right;" | 15
| colspan=5 |
| style="text-align: right;" | 69,103
| style="text-align: right;" |

Ward results

Abbey

Allestree

Alvaston

Babington

Blagreaves

Boulton

Breadsall

Darley

Litchurch

Littleover

Mackworth

Mickleover

Normanton

Osmanton

Sinfin

Spondon

References

1990 English local elections
May 1990 events in the United Kingdom
1990
1990s in Derbyshire